The second edition of the Johan Cruyff Shield was held on 17 August 1997 at the Amsterdam Arena in Amsterdam. It featured the 1996–97 Eredivisie champions, PSV Eindhoven, and the 1996–97 KNVB Cup winners, Roda JC. PSV won the match 3–1, with two goals from Phillip Cocu and a goal from Gilles De Bilde; Peter Van Houdt scored for Roda JC.

Match details

References

1997
Supercup
J
J
Johan Cruyff Shield